Fraserburgh United Football Club are a Scottish football club from the town of Fraserburgh, Aberdeenshire. Members of the Scottish Junior Football Association, they currently play in the North First Division. Founded in 1976, United are the smaller of the local teams after Fraserburgh F.C. of the Highland League. The club are based at College Park and their colours are tangerine and black.

Honours

 North East Premier League winners: 1979–80
 North Region Division One winners: 2009–10
 North East Division One winners: 1990–91
 Duthie (Acorn Heating) Cup: 1977–78
 Morrison Trophy: 1979–80, 2003–04, 2015–16

References

External links
 Club website

Sources
 Non-league Scotland
 Scottish Football Historical Archive

Football in Aberdeenshire
Football clubs in Scotland
Scottish Junior Football Association clubs
Association football clubs established in 1976
1976 establishments in Scotland
Fraserburgh